| prevseason          = 2018
| nextseason          = 2020
}}

The 2019 USL Championship Playoffs was the postseason tournament following the 2019 USL Championship regular season. Including USL Pro history, it was the ninth postseason tournament. The tournament began on October 23 and ended with the USL Championship Final on November 17.

The top 10 teams from each conference qualified for the playoffs. Each conference had a "Play-In round" where the 7 seed hosted the 10 seed and the 8 hosted the 9. The lowest remaining seed then played the 1 seed and the other play-in survivor played the 2 seed to form an 8-team playoff bracket. Each of the 8 team playoff brackets consisted of teams within their respective conference and the matches were hosted by the higher seed. The USL Cup will be the season's only match that involves teams from different conferences; it will be hosted by the conference champion with the better regular-season record.

Phoenix Rising FC clinched the USL Championship regular season title on September 28 and earned the number one seed in the Western Conference.

Conference standings 
The top 10 teams from each conference advanced to the playoffs.

Eastern Conference

Western Conference

Bracket

Schedule

Conference Play-In Round

Conference Quarterfinals

Conference Semifinals

Conference Finals

USL Championship Final 

Championship Game MVP: Konrad Plewa (SLC)

Top goalscorers 

Own Goals
Kyle Fisher (Birmingham) vs Pittsburgh

References

playoffs
USL Championship Playoffs